John Fullerton "Jack" MacArthur Sr. (March 30, 1914 – June 15, 2005) was an American pastor who is best remembered as founder and senior pastor at Calvary Bible Church in Burbank, founder and host of "Voice of Calvary" radio and television ministries, conference speaker, author, church planter, and father of pastor Dr. John F. MacArthur.

Childhood
Jack was born in Calgary to a Canadian Anglican minister, Harry MacArthur, and Olivia Fullerton MacArthur. His mother's father was a Presbyterian minister on Prince Edward Island, and his father, who dedicated his life to Christ as an adult, served as a pastor and an example for his young son. He had a boyhood desire to experience his father's faith which grew into a lifelong devotion to preaching God's Word.

Education
Jack grew up in Los Angeles, California and graduated from Los Angeles City College and Eastern Baptist Theological Seminary in Philadelphia with best friend and roommate Rev. Raymond Ronald Robinson, a Virginian, of the Grace Brethren Churches.

Subsequently, while his son John was an undergraduate at Los Angeles Pacific College (defunct), a four-year microcollege, Jack was awarded an honorary doctorate of literature from the same school.  Then later he was also awarded another honorarium from Bob Jones College in South Carolina.

Personal life
After marrying on June 25, 1937, MacArthur and his wife Irene (née Dockendorf) raised four children, including pastor John MacArthur.

Early Ministry Years
After Pastor Jack finished seminary, he first accepted the pastorate at Manchester Baptist Church in Los Angeles. MacArthur also traveled as an evangelist, preaching at many city and union campaigns throughout the United States, Canada and Europe.

Later, he served as director of evangelism for the Charles F. Fuller Foundation and as a field evangelist for the  Moody Bible Institute of Chicago. He became pastor at Fountain Avenue Baptist Church on January 4, 1948 and served for four years. From 1952 to 1954, he was pastor of the First Baptist Church of Downey.

Calvary Bible Church and "Voice of Calvary"
In November 1954, he and his staff left that church to establish the independent, nondenominational Harry MacArthur Memorial Bible Church of Glendale, which was named for his father; it was later renamed Calvary Bible Church after moving to Burbank, where he served as senior pastor.

While still pastoring in Southern California, he and Dr. J. Edwin Orr founded an outreach ministry to people in the film and television industry in the early 1940s." In 1942, the fruit of this endeavor was the "Voice of Calvary" radio program (which he hosted until his passing). Between 1956 and 1983, the program was also adapted for television. MacArthur supported the ministry of John M. Perkins, so Perkins named the ministry Voice of Calvary, a nod to MacArthur's radio program.

References

1914 births
2005 deaths
American Christian clergy
People from Calgary
People from Sun Valley, Los Angeles
20th-century American clergy